Moses Cleaveland (January 29, 1754 – November 16, 1806) was an American lawyer, politician, soldier, and surveyor from Connecticut who founded the city of Cleveland, Ohio, while surveying the Connecticut Western Reserve in 1796. During the American Revolution, Cleaveland was the brigadier general of the Connecticut militia.

Early life
Cleaveland was born in Canterbury, Connecticut Colony, to Colonel Aaron Cleaveland (1725–1785) and Thankful Cleaveland (1733–1822). He studied law at Yale College, where he was a member of Brothers in Unity, graduating in 1777. He was commissioned as an ensign in the 2nd Connecticut Regiment of the Continental Army in 1777 during the American Revolution. In 1779, he was promoted to captain of a company of "sappers and miners" (combat engineers) in the newly formed Corps of Engineers. He resigned from the army on June 7, 1781, and started a legal practice in Canterbury.

Militia career
Cleaveland was a member of the Connecticut convention that ratified the United States Constitution. He was elected to the Connecticut General Assembly several times and was commissioned brigadier general of militia in 1796. He was a shareholder in the Connecticut Land Company which had purchased land from Connecticut located in northeastern Ohio for $1,200,000. The land was reserved to Connecticut by Congress and was initially known as New Connecticut, but it came to be known as the Western Reserve.

Cleaveland was approached by the directors of the company in May 1796 and asked to lead the survey of the tract and the location of purchases. He was also responsible for the negotiations with the Native Americans living on the land. In June 1796, he set out from Schenectady, New York. His party was composed of 50 people, including six surveyors, a physician, a chaplain, a boatman, 37 employees, a few emigrants, and two women who accompanied their husbands. Some journeyed by land with the horses and cattle, while the main body went in boats up the Mohawk River, down the Oswego River, along the shore of Lake Ontario, and up the Niagara River, carrying their boats over the seven-mile portage at Niagara Falls.

Personal life
Cleaveland married Esther Champion on March 2, 1797, with whom he had four children.

Founding of Cleveland
At Buffalo, a delegation from the nearby Mohawk and Seneca tribes opposed the party's entrance into the Western Reserve, claiming it as their territory, but they waived their rights on the receipt of goods valued at $1,200. The expedition then coasted along the shore of Lake Erie and landed at the mouth of Conneaut Creek on July 4, 1796, which they named Port Independence. Nearby Native Americans were upset at the encroachment on their land, but they were appeased with gifts of beads and whiskey and allowed the surveys to proceed.

General Cleaveland coasted along the shore with a surveying party and landed at the mouth of the Cuyahoga River on July 22, 1796. He ascended the bank and determined that the spot was a favorable site for a city, with the river on the west and Lake Erie on the north. He had it surveyed into town lots, and the employees named the place Cleaveland in his honor. There were four settlers the first year, and growth was slow initially, reaching only 150 inhabitants in 1820. Cleaveland went home to Connecticut after the 1796 expedition and never returned to Ohio or the city that bears his name. He died in Canterbury, Connecticut, where he is also buried, but a statue of him stands in the Cleveland Public Square.

The settlement of "Cleaveland" eventually became known as "Cleveland". One theory is that Cleaveland's surveying party misspelled the name on their original map. More than likely though, the story goes back to the Cleveland Advertiser, a local paper in the early 1800s. They could not fit the words “Cleaveland Advertiser” on their masthead, so they dropped the extra “a” to make room and the name stuck.

Commemorations

Notes

References

"Moses Cleaveland". Ohio History Central.
"Cleaveland, Moses" at the Encyclopedia of Cleveland History
 

Attribution

1754 births
1806 deaths
American militia generals
American surveyors
American city founders
Continental Army officers from Connecticut
History of Cleveland
Lawyers from Cleveland
People from Canterbury, Connecticut
Connecticut Land Company
Burials in Connecticut
Military personnel from Connecticut
People of colonial Connecticut
Politicians from Cleveland
Grover Cleveland family